Belsh is a municipality in Elbasan County, central Albania. The municipality consists of the administrative units of Fierzë, Grekan, Kajan, Rrasë with Belsh constituting its seat. As of the Institute of Statistics estimate from the 2011 census, there were 8,781 people residing in Belsh and 19,503 in Belsh Municipality.

Cityscape

Notes

References

External links 

bashkiabelsh.al – Official Website 

 
Administrative units of Belsh
Municipalities in Elbasan County
Towns in Albania